The 2015 Austin Peay Governors football team represented Austin Peay State University during the 2015 NCAA Division I FCS football season. The Governors were led by third-year head coach Kirby Cannon, played their home games at Governors Stadium, and were a member of the Ohio Valley Conference. They finished the season 0–11, 0–8 in OVC play to finish in last place. This was the second time in the last three seasons that the Governors went winless and they are 1–34 in that span.

On November 23, with a three year record of 1–34, head coach Kirby Cannon was fired.

Schedule

Source: Schedule
GovTV airs across the state on Charter Channel 99, CDE Lightband Channel 9, and U-Verse 99. It is also the broadcast OVC Digital Network uses for its free stream.

References

Austin Peay
Austin Peay Governors football seasons
College football winless seasons
Austin Peay Governors football